Martucci is an Italian surname. Notable people with the surname include:

Alessandro Martucci, Italian painter
Christian Martucci, American musician and songwriter
Giuseppe Martucci, Italian composer, pianist and conductor
Matt Martucci, American sports announcer 
Mirko Martucci, Italian footballer

Italian-language surnames